Cyril J. Knowles (1905–1961) was a British cinematographer.  His credits include The Day Will Dawn (1942), Sodom and Gomorrah (1963), the location photography on Caravan (1946), and the African exterior shots on King Solomon's Mines (1937).

Selected filmography
 Illegal (1932)

External links

1905 births
1961 deaths
British cinematographers